Bread and Wine may refer to:

 Bread and Wine (novel), a 1936 novel by Ignazio Silone
 Bread and Wine: An Erotic Tale of New York, a 1999 graphic novel by Samuel R. Delany
 Brod und Wein ("Bread and Wine"), an elegy by Friedrich Hölderlin
 Eucharist, a sacrament in Christianity